Batri Sazi Nur (also Romanized as Bāṭrī Sāzī Nūr) is a village in Qaemabad Rural District, in the Central District of Shahriar County, Tehran Province, Iran. At the 2006 census, its population was 1,961, in 526 families.

References 

Populated places in Shahriar County